The Franken Knights are an American football team from Rothenburg ob der Tauber, Germany. Between 1995 and 1996 the club played in Würzburg for two seasons but returned to Rothenburg again the following year.

The club, originally formed as the Rothenburg Knights, has played in Germany's highest football league, the American Football Bundesliga, now the German Football League, on three occasions. In 2011, it won the southern division German Football League 2 for a fifth time and thereby earned the right to compete in the GFL once more in 2012.

History
The club was formed in late 1983 as the Rothenburg Knights.

Th club entered competitive football in 1984 in the tier two 2nd American Football Bundesliga. It won its division in its second year there and earned the right to play in the Bundesliga from 1986. What followed was an unsuccessful spell of two seasons in the league, being relegated again in 1987.

It took the Knights five seasons to return to the highest German football league, which it did in 1992, courtesy to another division title. The club qualified for the play-offs in its first season back in the Bundesliga, in 1993, but was knocked out in the quarter finals by the Berlin Adler. In 1994, it failed to make the play-offs. The following season the club changed its name to Franken Knights and moved to Würzburg for two seasons, in the hope of better future in a larger city, but it came last in its division and was relegated once more, ending its second spell in the league.

The Knights spend another four seasons in the 2nd Bundesliga before their third division title in the league, in 1999, moved them up once more. The club's most successful era was to come, with four play-off qualifications in five seasons there. While the club only missed out on the post season in 2001 in this era, it never managed to reach past the quarter finals in its four attempts in this time, being knocked out by the Braunschweig Lions (2000 and 2004), Hamburg Blue Devils (2002) and Berlin Adler (2003). At the end of the 2004 season, despite a fourth place in its division, the club decided to withdraw from the league for financial reasons. The club returned to the second division once more.

In the second tier, the Knights generally achieved good results, winning their division in 2009 and coming second in 2007 and 2008. In 2009, their division title earned them a trip to the promotion round but it lost both games against the Munich Cowboys and consequently wasn't promoted. It was however their division title in 2011 that won them their fourth promotion, to a GFL that was expanded from 14 to 16 teams.

In 2012, the club came fifth in the southern division of the GFL and thereby failed to qualify for the play-off. It failed again in 2013, finishing seventh this time. The club failed to win a game in the GFL in 2014 and came last in the southern division, having to face the Kirchdorf Wildcats in the relegation round. The Knights won both games in this round and retained their GFL place. The team came last again in its division in 2015 but declined to participate in the relegation round against the Frankfurt Universe and accepted relegation instead.

Honours
 GFL
 League membership: (14) 1986–1987, 1993–1995, 2000–2004, 2012–2015
 Play-off qualification: (5) 1993, 2000, 2002–2004
 GFL 2
 Southern Division champions: 1985, 1992, 1999, 2009, 2011
 Junior Bowl
 Runners-up: 2004, 2005

Recent seasons
Recent seasons of the club:

 SF = Semi finals
 LF = League Final
 RR = Relegation round
 PR = Promotion round

References

External links
  Official website
  German Football League official website
  Football History Historic American football tables from Germany

American football teams in Germany
German Football League teams
American football teams established in 1983
American football in Bavaria
1983 establishments in West Germany
Rothenburg ob der Tauber
Würzburg